Petter Røste Fossen (born February 16, 1991) is a Norwegian ice hockey player who is currently playing for Tønsberg of the Norwegian First Division.

External links

1991 births
Living people
Norwegian ice hockey forwards
Lillehammer IK players
Rosenborg IHK players
Stavanger Oilers players
Stjernen Hockey players
Tønsberg Vikings players